Slava-class cruiser
 Romeo-class submarine (Slava class in Bulgarian use)